Robert Randall Bragan (October 30, 1917 – January 21, 2010) was an American shortstop, catcher, manager, and coach in Major League Baseball and an influential minor league executive. His professional baseball career encompassed 73 years, from his first season as a player in the Class D Alabama–Florida League in 1937, to 2009, the last full year of his life, when he was still listed as a consultant to the Texas Rangers' organization.

On August 16, 2005, Bragan donned a uniform to manage the independent Central League Fort Worth Cats for one game, making him—at 87 years, nine months, and 16 days old—the oldest manager in professional baseball annals, besting by one week Connie Mack, the manager and part-owner of the Philadelphia Athletics from 1901 through 1950. Always known as an innovator with a sense of humor—and an umpire-baiter—Bragan was ejected in the third inning of his "comeback", thus also becoming the oldest person in any capacity to be ejected from a professional baseball game.

Bragan died on January 21, 2010, of a heart attack at his home in Fort Worth.

Career as player and field manager
During his Major League managerial career, Bragan never skippered a game past his 49th birthday. He managed the Pittsburgh Pirates (1956–57), Cleveland Indians (1958), and Milwaukee / Atlanta Braves (1963–66), each time getting fired in the mid-season of his final campaign. In Cleveland, he lasted a total of only 67 games of his maiden season before his dismissal—at the time of his firing, his was the shortest managerial stint in team history. His career big-league managerial won–lost record was below .500: 443–478 (.481). He was the Braves' pilot during the transitional period when they relocated from Milwaukee to Atlanta.

Despite his lack of success in the majors, Bragan was highly respected as a minor league manager, winning championships in 1948 and 1949 with Fort Worth of the Double-A Texas League during a successful 4-year run, and with the 1953 Hollywood Stars of the Open-Classification Pacific Coast League. A photograph of Bragan lying at the feet of an umpire who had ejected him, still arguing, was published in Life magazine at the time. Bragan also was a Major League coach for the Los Angeles Dodgers and Houston Colt .45s.

Bragan was born in Birmingham, Alabama. Bragan missed the 1945–46 seasons performing military service. He was commissioned a lieutenant in the United States Army and was stationed at Camp Wheeler, Georgia. In his only World Series appearance, in 1947 against the New York Yankees, he appeared in Game 6 as a pinch hitter; batting for Ralph Branca in the sixth inning with the game tied at five all, he doubled off Yankee relief pitcher Joe Page to drive home Carl Furillo with the eventual winning run. Bragan's hit gave him a perfect 1.000 career batting average in Fall Classic play.

Influenced by Branch Rickey
Bragan was a protégé of Branch Rickey, the Baseball Hall of Fame front office executive, who hired him as an unproven young manager at Fort Worth in 1948. Then 30 years old, Bragan had started the 1948 season with the Dodgers but played sparingly, getting into only nine games (starting two) through June 27, and collecting only two hits in a dozen at-bats. When Rickey wanted to make room for Roy Campanella, who was starring in the minors, he offered Bragan the Fort Worth managerial job; he took over in July 1948, and remained with the Cats through 1952. Then, in 1953, Rickey, by now heading the Pittsburgh front office, brought Bragan to Hollywood and the Pirates' organization.

Bragan—the Dodgers' second-string catcher at the time—was one of a group of white players, largely from the American South, who signed a petition against Robinson's presence. He even asked Rickey to trade him. But Bragan quickly relented. "After just one road trip, I saw the quality of Jackie the man and the player", Bragan told MLB.com in 2005. "I told Mr. Rickey I had changed my mind and I was honored to be a teammate of Jackie Robinson." When Bragan attended Rickey's funeral in 1965, he stated he decided to attend because, "Branch Rickey made me a better man."

As a manager, Bragan earned a reputation for "color-blindedness." Wills' baseball career had stalled in the Dodgers' farm system until he learned to switch hit under Bragan. Said the Dodgers' then-general manager, Buzzie Bavasi, "Bobby would call six times a day and tell me over again how Wills had learned to switch-hit and how he was a great team leader, off and on the field, and how I was absolutely nuts if I didn't bring him up right away." After batting .313 in 48 games with Spokane in 1959, Wills was promoted to the Dodgers in June and proceeded to win the regular shortstop job. He would fashion a 14-year MLB career, play on three world champions, make seven NL All-Star teams, and in  win the National League Most Valuable Player Award and set a new record for stolen bases in a season, with 104 thefts, breaking Ty Cobb's 47-year-old mark.

In his 1976 memoir The Lords of Baseball, longtime Dodger executive Harold Parrott would claim that Bragan's hiring by the Braves in 1963 was orchestrated by Rickey to thwart a plan by Dodger owner Walter O'Malley to replace his manager, eventual Hall of Famer Walter Alston, with Leo Durocher. Alston had come under withering criticism for failing to win the  National League pennant but O'Malley decided he would make the move on hiring Durocher only if he could find a suitable "soft landing spot" for Alston, who had managed his club for nine seasons and, to that point, had won three NL flags and two World Series titles. The owner chose Milwaukee, fading as contenders and with a managerial vacancy to fill, as Alston's ideal destination. According to Parrott's memoir, Rickey—then in semi-retirement but still O'Malley's bitter enemy—discovered the scheme and brokered the marriage between Bragan and the Braves' ownership before O'Malley's plan could materialize. Alston kept his job in Los Angeles and led the 1963 Dodgers to the world championship for his third Series triumph; he would remain at the Dodger helm through 1976, win three additional pennants and, in 1965, his fourth and final world title.

President of Texas League and National Association
In 1969, Bragan, a Fort Worth resident, began a new career chapter when he became president of the Texas League. He was so successful, in 1975 he was elected president of the minor leagues' governing body, the National Association of Professional Baseball Leagues.

Upon completion of his three-year term as president of the minor leagues, Bobby and his wife, Gwenn, returned home to Fort Worth, where they had lived since Rickey assigned him to manage the Fort Worth Cats in 1948. Bragan joined the Texas Rangers' front office in 1979 and continued to make appearances and speaking engagements on behalf of the ballclub well into his eighties.

After Gwenn Bragan's death in 1983, Bobby married Roberta Beckman. It was Roberta who suggested to Bobby that he establish a scholarship foundation to encourage youth to do well in school and go on to college. With the financial seed money provided by Roberta, the Bobby Bragan Youth Foundation (BBYF) was established in 1991.

Roberta Beckman Bragan died in 1993. Bobby married Betty Bloxam in 1995 and the two stayed together until his death.

As he passed his 90th birthday, Bragan continued an active schedule, as the Chairman of the Bobby Bragan Youth Foundation and making numerous appearances for civic organizations and businesses, including his beloved Fort Worth Cats as well as in schools, where he enjoyed entertaining and motivating students.

Each year, the Bobby Bragan Youth Foundation honors outstanding athletes and executives for the achievements on and off of the playing field at the annual Bobby Bragan Gala to raise funds for the scholarships. Honorees have included Joe DiMaggio, Hank Aaron, Larry King, Tommy Lasorda, Bobby Valentine, Bud Selig, Willie Mays, Lou Brock and Brooks Robinson.

Bragan came from a baseball family. Five of the six Bragan boys played baseball professionally. His late brother Jimmy was a minor league player and longtime coach and scout in Major League Baseball who himself was president of the AA Southern League during the 1980s. His brother Peter owned and operated the Jacksonville Suns of the Southern League for more than 25 years, and his late son, Bobby Bragan Jr., operated the Elmira ball club in the New York–Penn League.

Honors
1950 – Selected as Outstanding Young Man of Fort Worth
1976 – Elected Outstanding Man of Florida by St. Petersburg Chamber of Commerce
1980 – Elected into Alabama Sports Hall of Fame
1989 – Received the Wall of Fame from P.O.N.Y. Baseball, Washington, Pennsylvania
1998 – Inducted into the Kinston Professional Baseball Hall of Fame
2004 – Number retired (# 10) by Fort Worth Cats
2005 – Elected into the Texas Sports Hall of Fame 
2006 – Inducted into the Legends of LaGrave

References

Further reading
Bragan, Bobby. "Here's My All-Time, All-Star Batting Line-Up". Family Weekly. July 7, 1974.

External links

LosAngelesDodgersonline.com

Bobby Bragan Youth Foundation

1917 births
2010 deaths
Atlanta Braves managers
Baseball coaches from Alabama
Baseball players from Birmingham, Alabama
Brooklyn Dodgers players
Caribbean Series managers
Cleveland Indians managers
Fort Worth Cats players
Hollywood Stars managers
Hollywood Stars players
Houston Astros scouts
Houston Colt .45s coaches
Journalists from Alabama
Los Angeles Dodgers coaches
Major League Baseball broadcasters
Major League Baseball bullpen coaches
Major League Baseball shortstops
Major League Baseball third base coaches
Milwaukee Braves managers
Minor league baseball executives
Minor league baseball managers
Montreal Expos announcers
Panama City Pelicans players
Pensacola Pilots players
Philadelphia Phillies players
Pittsburgh Pirates managers
Spokane Indians managers
Spokane Indians players
Sportspeople from Fort Worth, Texas
United States Army officers
United States Army personnel of World War II
Military personnel from Texas